This is a list of the extreme points of North America: the points that are highest and lowest, and farther north, south, east or west than any other location on the continent. Some of these points are debatable, given the varying definitions of North America.

North America and surrounding islands
Northernmost point — Kaffeklubben Island, Greenland . Although politically part of the Kingdom of Denmark, Greenland is geologically part of the North American plate.  If non-permanent islands are included, then the northernmost point is Qeqertaq Avannarleq. If Greenland is excluded from North America, the northernmost point is Cape Columbia, Ellesmere Island, Nunavut, Canada .
Southernmost point — Cocos Island, Costa Rica 
Westernmost point — The westernmost point depends on the definition of "westernmost". If following the International Date Line, it would be Cape Wrangell on Attu Island, Alaska, United States , or the tiny (ca. 200m diameter) Peaked Island, just off the coast to the west.  However, if the border between east and west is defined by the 180th meridian, the westernmost point is the West Point of Amatignak Island , as Attu Island is in the Eastern Hemisphere.
Easternmost point — Nordostrundingen, Greenland . If Greenland is excluded, then the easternmost point is Cape Spear, Newfoundland, Canada . Again, if one uses the technical definition of longitude, it is Pochnoi Point on Semisopochnoi Island, Alaska,  since the state stretches into the Eastern Hemisphere.

Continental North America
Northernmost point —  Murchison Promontory, Canada 71°58′N 94°57′W
Southernmost point — Punta Mariato, Panama 
Westernmost point — Cape Prince of Wales, Alaska 
Easternmost point — Cape Saint Charles, Labrador

Highest points
Ixchiguán, San Marcos Department, Guatemala — highest town of North America at 3200 m (10,500 feet)
Leadville, Colorado, United States  — highest city of North America at 3094 m (10,152 feet)
Lake County Airport, Colorado, United States  — highest airfield of North America at 3026 m (9,927 feet)

Lowest points
Badwater Basin, Death Valley, California, United States  — lowest land surface of North America at 
Salton Sea, California, United States  — lowest lake of North America at −69 m (−226 feet)
Furnace Creek Airport, California, United States  — lowest airfield of the Americas at −64 m (−210 feet)
Furnace Creek, California, United States  — lowest settlement of the Americas at −58 m (−190 ft)
Calipatria, California, United States  — lowest city of the Americas at −56 m (−184 feet)
Lago Enriquillo, Dominican Republic, Hispaniola  — lowest lake on an island and lowest surface point on any ocean island on Earth at −27 m (−89 feet)
New Orleans, Louisiana, United States  — lowest city of the Americas with an average elevation of −0.5 m (−1.5 feet)
Isthmus of Rivas, Rivas, Nicaragua  — lowest pass between Caribbean Sea and Pacific Ocean (on the Continental Divide of the Americas) at 56 m (184 feet)
Great Slave Lake bottom, Northwest Territories, Canada  — lowest fresh water point of the Americas at −458 m (−1,503 feet)

Other points

Islands
Island of Greenland   — most extensive island on Earth at 2,130,800 km2 (822,700 square miles) and tallest island of Western Hemisphere.
Island of Cuba  — most extensive island of the Caribbean at 104,556 km2 (40,369 square miles).
Hispaniola  — tallest island of the Caribbean and second most extensive island of the Caribbean at 76,480 km2 (29,529 square miles).
Manitoulin Island in Lake Huron, Ontario, Canada  — most extensive lake island on Earth at 2,766 km2 (1,068 square miles)

Lakes
Lake Superior, Canada and the United States  — most voluminous lake in Western Hemisphere at 11,600 km3 (2,800 cubic miles)
Great Slave Lake, Northwest Territories, Canada  — deepest lake in Western Hemisphere at 614 m (2,014 feet)
Lake Michigan–Huron, Canada and the United States  — most extensive lake in Western Hemisphere and the most extensive fresh water lake on Earth at 117,702 km2 (45,445 square miles)
Nettilling Lake on Baffin Island, Nunavut, Canada  — most extensive lake on an island on Earth at 5,066 km2 (1,956 square miles)
Great Salt Lake, Utah, United States  — most extensive endorheic lake at 4,400 km2 (1,700 square miles)
Lake Manitou on Manitoulin Island in Lake Huron, Ontario, Canada  — most extensive lake on an island in a lake on Earth at 104 km2 (40 square miles)

Rivers
Mississippi Basin, Canada and the United States  — most extensive river basin at 2,981,076 km2 (1,151,000 square miles)
Mississippi-Missouri-Jefferson Rivers, United States  — longest river system at 6,275 km (3,902 miles)
Missouri River, United States  — longest main stem river at 3,768 km (2,341 miles)
Mississippi River, United States  — longest Gulf of Mexico main stem river at 3,544 km (2,202 miles)
Yukon River, Canada and the United States  — longest Bering Sea main stem river at 3,185 km (1,979 miles)
Nelson River, Manitoba, Canada  — longest Hudson Bay main stem river at 2,575 km (1,600 miles)
Colorado River, United States and Mexico  — longest Gulf of California main stem river at 2,330 km (1,450 miles)
Columbia River, Canada and the United States  — longest Pacific Ocean main stem river at 2,000 km (1,243 miles)
Mackenzie River, Northwest Territories, Canada  — longest Arctic Ocean main stem river at 1,738 km (1,080 miles)
Saint Lawrence River, United States and Canada  — longest Atlantic Ocean main stem river at 965 km (600 miles)

Extreme points of North American countries 
Extreme points of Canada
Extreme points of Cuba
Extreme points of Greenland
Extreme points of Mexico
Extreme points of the United States

See also
Geography of North America
Extreme points of the Earth
Extreme points of the Americas
Extreme points of North America
Extreme points of Canada
Extreme points of Canadian provinces
Extreme communities of Canada
Extreme points of Greenland
Extreme points of Mexico
Extreme points of the United States
Extreme points of U.S. states
Extreme points of New England
Extreme points of Central America
Extreme points of the Caribbean
Extreme points of Cuba
Extreme points of South America

Notes

References

External links

Geography of North America
North America
North America
North America